The Sabre 340 is an American ultralight trike that was designed and produced by Sabre Aircraft of Buckeye, Arizona. The aircraft was supplied fully assembled.

The 340 was introduced in 1991. Sabre Aircraft ceased operations in 2008.

Design and development
It features a cable-braced hang glider-style high wing, weight-shift controls, a single-seat open cockpit, tricycle landing gear and a single engine in pusher configuration.

The aircraft is made from tubing, with its single-surface Sabre 14 wing covered in Dacron sailcloth. Its  span wing is supported by a single tube-type kingpost and uses an "A" frame control bar. As a budget design the basic aircraft has no cockpit fairing or windshield, but does feature nosewheel suspension and heavy-duty main landing gear struts as standard equipment. The standard engine supplied was the twin cylinder, two-stroke, air-cooled Kawasaki 340 snowmobile engine, which produces . Available factory options included a fiberglass cockpit fairing, nosewheel brakes, wheel pants, ballistic parachute and an aero-tow kit. Optional engines included the  Rotax 447 and the  Rotax 503. The standard wing supplied was Sabre Aircraft's own Sabre 14 single-surface wing, with the double-surface Ukrainian-built Aeros Stranger 15 wing optional.

The design achieved a very low price point and in its basic configuration sold for US$6,000, complete and ready to fly, in the late 1990s. It was the least expensive complete aircraft available at that time.

Specifications (340)

References

1990s United States ultralight aircraft
Single-engined pusher aircraft
Ultralight trikes
Vehicles introduced in 1991